La La La, or variants, may refer to:

Music
 "La la la", a non-lexical vocable in music

Albums 
La La La (Luis Alberto Spinetta and Fito Páez album), 1986
La La La (Maki Ohguro album), 1995
La La La, a 2004 album by Sammi Cheng

Songs

Songs with the title
 "La, la, la", by Massiel, 1968 
 "La La La (If I Had You)", by Bobby Sherman, 1969
 "La-La-La" (Jay-Z song), 2003
 "La La La" (LMFAO song), 2009
 "La La La" (Snoop Lion song), 2012
 "La La La" (Naughty Boy song) 2013
 "Lalala" (song), by Y2K and bbno$, 2019
 "LaLaLa" (Black Coffee and Usher song), 2019
 "La La La", by The Rattles, 1965
 "La La La", by Gerry and the Pacemakers, 1966
 "La La La", by Misia from Marvelous, 2001
 "La La La", by The Bird and the Bee, 2007
 "La La La", by Chris Webby, 2009
 "La La La", by Auburn, 2010
 "La La La", by Indiggo, 2011
 "La La La" by Mike Krol, 2015
 "La La la", by Willy William, 2018
 "Lalala Shiawase no Uta", by Cute, 2008 
 "Lalalalalalalalalala", by Mikolas Josef, 2020
 "LALALA", by NOAHFINNCE, 2022

Songs that include the term
 "Pesenka", or "Pesenka (La La La)", by Ruki Vverh!, 1998
 "Around the World (La La La La La)", by ATC, 2000
 "Sing La La La", by Carolina Márquez, 2013
 "Sing and Move (La La La Laaaa)", by Banaroo, 2006
 "Go Hard (La.La.La)", by Kreayshawn, 2012
 "Dare (La La La)", by Shakira, 2014
 "La-La-La-Lies", by the Who from My Generation, 1965

Other uses
 Lalala, a residential area in Libreville, Gabon
 Kylie: La La La, a 2002 book by Kylie Minogue and William Baker

See also
La (disambiguation)
La La (disambiguation)
Ululation, a long, wavering, high-pitched vocal sound